Miss Spain 2017 may refer to these events:
Miss Universe Spain 2017, Miss Spain 2017 for Miss Universe 2017
Miss World Spain 2017, Miss Spain 2017 for Miss World 2017